George W. Dunne Golf Course and Driving Range is located in Bremen Township, Cook County, just outside Oak Forest, Illinois, a south suburb of Chicago. Open to the public, it is owned by the Forest Preserve District of Cook County and was designed by Dick Nugent and Ken Killian. 

Sports venues in Cook County, Illinois
Golf clubs and courses in Illinois